Oflag X-D was a German World War II prisoner-of-war camp for officers (Offizierlager) located in Fischbek, a Stadtteil of Hamburg, Germany.

Camp history 
The camp was established in May 1941. On 22 June 1943, all reserve officers of the Belgian Army held at Oflag II-A in Prenzlau were moved to Oflag X-D Fischbek. The camp was liberated in May 1945 by troops of the British 7th Armoured Division, 2nd Army.

See also

 L'Obstinée, Masonic Lodge
 List of prisoner-of-war camps in Germany
 Raymond Troye

References

Oflags
World War II prisoner of war camps in Germany
1941 establishments in Germany
1945 disestablishments in Germany